Betamethasone sodium phosphate is a synthetic glucocorticoid corticosteroid and a corticosteroid ester.

References

Corticosteroid esters
Glucocorticoids
Phosphate esters